This is a complete list of ice hockey players who played for the Adirondack Phantoms of the American Hockey League (AHL). It includes players that played at least one match, either in the AHL regular season or in the AHL playoffs.

Key

Goaltenders

Goaltenders who played for the team

Skaters

Skaters who played for the team

Notes

 The seasons column lists the first year of the season of the player's first game and the last year of the season of the player's last game. For example, a player who played one game in the 2000–01 season would be listed as playing with the team from 2000–2001, regardless of what calendar year the game occurred within.''

See also
List of Philadelphia Phantoms players
List of Lehigh Valley Phantoms players

References

 

Adirondack Phantoms
Adirondack Phantoms
 
Adirondack Phantoms